Dimbach may refer to:

 Dimbach, Germany
 Dimbach, Austria